Kempinski Hotel Corvinus, a member of the Kempinski group, is a five star hotel in Budapest, Hungary. Forbes gives it a four-star rating.

It is located in the city centre of Pest in the district of Erzsébetváros, next to Erzsébet Square, near the Danube, Dohány Street Synagogue, St. Stephen's Basilica, Andrássy Avenue, Hungarian State Opera House, Budapest British Embassy.

The C-shape building was designed by Hungarian architect  and as hotel opened in 1992 with 335 rooms, 31 suites, restaurants, bar, spa and meeting facilities.

The hotel is named after King Matthias Corvinus, who ruled Hungary in the late 15th century.

References

External links 

Official website of Kempinski Hotel Corvinus, Budapest

Hotels in Budapest
Budapest
1992 establishments in Hungary
Hotels established in 1992